Robert Fairweather (24 July 1845 – 31 May 1925) was an Australian cricketer. He played one first-class match for New South Wales in 1868/69.

See also
 List of New South Wales representative cricketers

References

External links
 

1845 births
1925 deaths
Australian cricketers
New South Wales cricketers
Cricketers from Sydney